Yours Truly are an Australian pop-punk band formed in 2016 in Sydney, New South Wales. Their debut studio album, Self Care (2020), peaked at number 19 on the ARIA Albums Chart.

History
Yours Truly were formed in 2016 and self-released their debut EP Too Late for Apologies in March 2017. The group's debut singles "Winter" and "Strangers" received airplay on Triple J.

"High Hopes" was released in January 2018. The group released their debut studio album Self Care on 18 September 2020, which debuted at number 19 on the ARIA Albums Chart.

On 9 July 2021, the band released the single "Walk Over My Grave", their first new music since Self Care.

Musical style and influences
Musically, Yours Truly are a pop-punk band.

Discography

Studio albums

Extended plays

Singles

Impact
Yours Truly have been credited as one of several bands who "reinvent[ed] pop-punk [in] 2021".

Awards and nominations

ARIA Music Awards
The ARIA Music Awards is an annual ceremony presented by Australian Recording Industry Association (ARIA), which recognise excellence, innovation, and achievement across all genres of the music of Australia. They commenced in 1987.

! 
|-
! scope="row"| 2021
| Self Care
| Best Hard Rock or Heavy Metal Album
| 
| 
|}

Heavy Music Awards
Launched in 2017, the Heavy Music Awards democratically recognise the best of the year across the heavy music landscape – artists, events, photographers, designers, producers and more. With a panel of several hundred industry insiders nominating the finalists, the public has the final say on who wins.

! 
|-
! scope="row"| 2021
| Yours Truly
| Best International Breakthrough Artist 
| 
| 
|}

J Awards
The J Awards are an annual series of Australian music awards that were established by the Australian Broadcasting Corporation's youth-focused radio station Triple J. They commenced in 2005.

! 
|-
! scope="row"| 2020
| Yours Truly
| Unearthed Artist of the Year
| 
| 
|}

References

External links
 
 

2016 establishments in Australia
Australian pop punk groups
Musical groups established in 2016
Musical quartets
Female-fronted musical groups